Silk Glacier is a glacier, 10 miles (16 km) long, draining the east slopes of the Churchill Mountains between Mount Frost and Mount Zinkovich to enter Nursery Glacier. Named by Advisory Committee on Antarctic Names (US-ACAN) for Cdt. P.R.H. Silk, RNZN, commanding officer of HMNZS Endeavour II in Antarctic waters, 1963–64.

References

Glaciers of Oates Land